Tim Anderson is an American politician. A Republican, he is a member of the Virginia House of Delegates, representing the 83rd district after defeating Nancy Guy in 2021.

In 2022, Anderson filed an unsuccessful lawsuit in Virginia Beach Circuit Court attempting to ban private bookstores from selling two books, A Court of Mist and Fury by Sarah J. Maas and Gender Queer by Maia Kobabe, to anyone under 16 years of age.

References 

Living people
21st-century American politicians
Republican Party members of the Virginia House of Delegates
Politicians from Norfolk, Virginia
Year of birth missing (living people)